Stadttheater Kempten is a theatre in Kempten, Bavaria, Germany.

Theatres in Bavaria